The 2022 Northern Colorado Hailstorm FC season will be the first season in the club's history.  The club, which was announced on January 12, 2021, will be playing in USL League One, a third division league in the American soccer pyramid. The club will play their home games at Future Legends Complex, a sports park currently under construction in Windsor, Colorado. In August 2021, the club announced that former Libya international Éamon Zayed will manage the club in its first season.

Club

Roster

Competitions

Exhibitions

USL League One

Standings

Match results

U.S. Open Cup 

Because of the 2022 USL League One schedule, Northern Colorado played their first-ever competitive match in the Second Round of the Open Cup.

References

Northern Colorado Hailstorm FC
Northern Colorado Hailstorm FC
Northern Colorado Hailstorm FC